

P 
 
 

Pac–Par 

 RV Pacific Escort
 
  (//)
 
  (/)
  (/)
  (/)
 
  (/)
 
 
 
 
  (/)
  (/)
  (/)
 
 
  (/)
  (/)
 
 
  (/)
 
  (/)
 
 
  (/)
 
 
 
  (//)
 
  (/)
 
 
 
 
  (ex USS SC-1470)
  
 
  (/)
  (/)
 
 
 
 
 
  (/)
 
 
 
 
 
 
 
 
 
 
  (/)
 
  (/)
 
  (//)

Pas–Pay 

 
 
  (/)
  (/)
  (/)
  (/)
  (/)
  (/)
  (/)
  (/)
 
 
  (/)
  (/OSS-30)
  (//)
 
 
  (/)
  (/)
 
 
 USS Patrol #1 (SP-45)
 USS Patrol #2 (SP-409)
 USS Patrol #4 (SP-8)
 USS Patrol #5 (SP-29)
 USS Patrol #6 (SP-54)
 USS Patrol #7 (SP-31)
 USS Patrol #8 (SP-56)
 USS Patrol #10 (SP-85)
 USS Patrol #11 (SP-1106)
 
  (/)
 
  (/)
 
  (/)
 
 
 
 
 
  (/)
 
  (/)
 
 
  (/)
 
 
  (/)
  (/)
  (/, //)
 
 
 

Pc–Pe 

 USS PC-815 (PC-815)
 USS PC-1217 (PC-1217)
 USS PC-1264 (PC-1264)
  (/)
  (/)
 
 
 
 
  (/)
  (/)
 
 
  (/)
 
 
 
 
  (/, /)
  (/)
 
  (/, /)
 
  (/)
 
 
 
 
 
  (//)
  (//, /)
 
 
 
  (/, /)
 
  (/)
 
 
 
  (/////)
 
 
  (/)
  (///)
 
 
 
  (/)
 
  (/)
 
  (/)
  (/)
 
  (/)
 
  (/)
  (/)
 
 
 
 
 
 
 
 
 
 
 
 
 
 
  (/)
 
 
  (/)

Pf–Pi 

  (/)
 
 
 
 
 
 
  (/)
  (/)
 
 
  (/)
  (/)
 
  (///)
 
  (/)
 
 
 
 
  (/)
  (/)
  (/)
 
  (/)
 
 
 
  (/)
 
  (/)
 
 
  (/)
 
  (/, /)
 
 
 
  (/)
 
 
 
  (/)
  (/)
 
 
 
 
 
 
 
 
 
 
  (/)
  (/)
  (/)
  (/)
 
  (/)
 
  (/)
  (/)
  (1918, 1929, /, OSS-31)
 
 
 
  (/)
  (/)
 
  (/)
 
 
  (/)
 
 
 
  (//)
  (/)
 
 
  (/)
  (/)
  (/)

Pl–Pol 

 
 
 
 
 
 
 
  (/)
 
  (/)
  (/)
 
 
 
 
 
  (//)
  (/)
  (/)
  (/)
  (/)
  (/)
 
 
 
 
 
 
  (//)
 
 
 
  (/)
  (/)
 
 
 
 
 
 
 
 
 
 
  (/)
 
 

Pom–Pow 

 
 
 
 
 
 
 
  (/)
 
  (/)
  (/)
 
 
 
 
  (//)
 
 
 
  (/)
 
 
 
 
 
 
 
 
 
 
 
 
 
 
 
 
 
 
 
 
 
 
 
  (/)
  (/)
 
 
  (/)
 
 
  (1861, /)

Pra–Pri 

 
 
 
 
  (//, /)
  (/)
 
  (/)
 
 
 
 
  (/)
  
  (/)
  (//)
 
 
 
 
 
 
 
  (/)
 
 
 
  (/, //)
 
  (/)
 
 
  (/)
 
  (/)
  (/)
  (//, ///)
 
 
  (/, ///)
 
 
 
 
 
 
 
 
 
 
 
 
 
 
 
  (/)
  (/)
 
 
 
  (/)

Pro–Py 

  (/)
 
 
 
 
 
 
  (/)
  (/)
  (/)
  (//)
 
 
 
  (//)
  (/)
 
  (//)
 
 PT boats
  (/)
 
  (/, /, /)
 
 
 
  (//)
 
 
 
 
  (/)
  (/)
 
 
 
 
  (//)
 
 

External links 
 navy.mil: List of homeports and their ships
 Dictionary of American Naval Fighting Ships
  Naval Vessel Register